Andrew Howard (born June 12, 1969, in Cardiff, Wales) is a Welsh theatre, television and film actor.

Training
Howard trained at Cygnet Training Theatre in Exeter in the late 1980s, touring in productions of A Christmas Carol, Twelfth Night,  Beggar's Opera and Peer Gynt among others.

Career

Stage
On stage roles included Alex DeLarge in A Clockwork Orange, Peer Gynt in Peer Gynt, Orestes in Electra at theatres, including The Royal National Theatre (London) and The Donmar Warehouse (London).

Film
Howard has made notable appearances in several major productions, including the HBO miniseries Band of Brothers and the Guy Ritchie caper Revolver, as well as costarring alongside Patrick Stewart and Glenn Close in the 2003 TV movie The Lion in Winter. He played "Bad" Frank Phillips in History Channel's Hatfields & McCoys.

In 2001, Howard was awarded best actor at the Tokyo International Film Festival for his portrayal of Jon in Mr In-Between. He co-wrote the screenplay for Shooters, a 2002 British crime drama in which he also starred. In 2009, he played Thomas Luster in the thriller film Luster under the direction from Adam Mason.

In 2009, he was also in the film Blood River, for which Howard won Best Actor Award at the Honolulu Film Festival and the Jack Nance Breakthrough Performance Award at the New York Film Festival Downtown. In 2011, he starred in Limitless, a film by Neil Burger originally titled The Dark Fields.

In 2014, he played a supporting role as the lead Russian henchman, Maxim, in Taken 3. Since 2015, he has appeared in the television series Bates Motel as Will Decody, who was originally portrayed by actor Ian Hart in the first season.

In 2020, he played Stephen in Tenet. In the same year, he starred as Officer Merk, a racist NYPD officer, in the Oscar-winning short film Two Distant Strangers.

Filmography

Film

Television

Screenwriter
 2002 Shooters film
 2010 Pig film

References

External links

1969 births
Living people
Welsh male film actors
Welsh male television actors
Male actors from Cardiff
Place of birth missing (living people)
Welsh male stage actors
20th-century Welsh male actors
21st-century Welsh male actors